The 2007 Gombe State gubernatorial election was the 3rd gubernatorial election of Gombe State. Held on April 14, 2007, the People's Democratic Party nominee Mohammed Danjuma Goje won the election, defeating Abubakar Habu Hashidu of the Democratic People's Party.

Results 
Mohammed Danjuma Goje from the People's Democratic Party won the election, defeating Abubakar Habu Hashidu from the Democratic People's Party. Registered voters was 1,410,234.

References 

Gombe State gubernatorial elections
Gombe gubernatorial
April 2007 events in Nigeria